Nina Simone at the Village Gate is an album by singer / pianist / songwriter Nina Simone. Released in early 1962, it was her third live album for Colpix (and sixth album overall). The album was recorded at The Village Gate, a nightclub in Greenwich Village, New York in late March 1961, nearly a year before it saw release. The original release featured eight of the twelve songs performed at the gig. In 2005, an extended version of the album was released with the four remaining tracks.

Background 
It is particularly notable for the number of folk songs and African related songs on the album early in Simone's career. Richard Pryor had one of his first nights as a comedian opening for her.

Use in media
 "Just in Time" was used at the end of the movie Before Sunset (2004).

Critical reception 
The record received a glowing response when reviewed in 2012 by Gaslight Records, being given a rating of 9.5/10. The reviewer highlighted the "rawness of the recording technique", stating that it catches the "incredible atmosphere" of the nightclub and succeeds in presenting "a young Nina Simone in her most real and free flowing state yet and this is perhaps most apparent in the way that her flawless vocal along with her innovative and dynamic piano playing shine through as effortless and unrivalled abilities without any need for recording studio gloss or trickery." AllMusic's reviewer stated that "Nina Simone, who was always in a category by herself, is heard throughout in her early prime," and that she "has the rare ability of really being able to dig into material and bring out unexpected meaning in familiar lyrics."

Track listing

Personnel
Nina Simone – vocals, piano
Al Schackman – guitar
Chris White – bass
Bobby Hamilton – drums

References

1962 live albums
Nina Simone live albums
Colpix Records albums
Albums recorded at the Village Gate